The Faisalabad Wolves was a domestic limited overs cricket team based in Faisalabad, Punjab, Pakistan. The team was established in 2004 and its home ground was Iqbal Stadium.

The team were champions in the maiden season 2004–05 of the ABN-AMRO Twenty-20 Cup now known as Faysal Bank T20 Cup

The team are World Champions because they won the only International 20:20 Club Championship which was played in England in September 2005.

The 2010 kit sponsors of the team was Ghani Automobile Industries.
The 2011 kit sponsors of the team was Happilac Paints.

Honours

Result summary

T20 results

Captains' Record

Sponsor
The Wolves were sponsored by Ghani Automobiles in 2010–11.

The 2011 sponsor for Faisalabad Wolves is Happilac Paints.
The 2012 Sponsor for Faisalabad Wolves is G'Five Pakistan.

See also
 Pakistan Super League

References

External links
Twenty 20 Record page for Faisalabad Wolves
Cricketarchive page for Faisalabad Wolves
Faisalabad Wolves in CLT20 2013

Volves
2004 establishments in Pakistan
Cricket clubs established in 2004
Cricket teams in Pakistan
Wolves